The Humberg is a mountain in the south of Kaiserslautern, Germany, that stands on the border of the Palatinate forest. With a height of 425 meters, it is the highest point in the area of Kaiserslautern. At its peak, the Humberg Tower provides a dramatic view of the area below.

Mountains and hills of the Palatinate Forest
Mountains and hills of Rhineland-Palatinate